Thomas Brückner (born 12 June 1975), known by his stage name Tomcraft, is a German DJ and producer. He specializes in progressive house and progressive trance music and is better known for having created the tracks "Loneliness" and "Prosac", working alongside Eniac.

Music career
Tomcraft began working as a DJ in Munich in 1994, shifting between techno and the emerging progressive trance style. The following year, he released his first track, "This Is No House". He first met Eniac in 1996, and the two immediately started producing music together, beginning with "Viva". The same year yielded the track "Prosac", but this did not achieve success until it was re-released in 2001. For a decade or so, he worked alongside fellow German producer Eniac as an explosive studio team, steadily building hype and acclaim with regular releases on the country’s famous Kosmo Recordings amongst others.

From the end of the 1990s to 2003 Tomcraft was resident DJ in Munich's techno club .

2002 was also the year Tomcraft released "Loneliness", a progressive vocal track that topped the charts in the United Kingdom in May 2003. Following his breakthrough hit, they parted ways with Eniac following some disagreements, and Tomcraft set about building his reputation in the underground scene further – with the launch of Great Stuff and subsequent signings of such a talents as Lutzenkirchen, Coburn, Oliver Koletzki, The Egg and Ramon Tapia.

2005 saw the launch of Craft Music, a new outlet for his productions with all other signed releases treated to a remix by the man himself – with the label undergoing a major relaunch in 2010 to bring it back to the forefront of house and techno music.

In the interim, he released several other big club smashes, including Prozac and Overdose, with regular releases ensuring his name remained unforgotten and an impressive 4 artist albums released across the space of 6 years showing that he was no mere 12” artist. Having resolved their disagreements, he is now once again working with Eniac on new material, with A Place Called Soul one of their first reunited efforts and a new artist album scheduled for 2011. “It’s always something special when we work together” he beams of his colleague, who has moved back from Berlin to Munich so that they can work on new music day in, day out. Meanwhile, he’s also been working regularly with English talent Tim Healey (formerly known as 'Coburn'), staying with his family in Brighton for a week at a time and working solidly on new material. His collaborations with vocalists over the years included workings with such a stars as Jimmy Pop (Bloodhound Gang's singer), German soul sensation Xavier Naidoo, the USA’s venerable Tommie Sunshine and local rapper Sido, his mind being always open to new and disparate influences and styles and his studio forever expanding with new bits of kit and vintage machinery.

Naturally his DJ career exploded upon the mega-success of that single, with highlights over the years including playing to 1.3 million people at Berlin’s Love Parade, Japan’s famous Fuji Rock Festival, major festivals in Brazil, and some of the coolest clubs in Singapore, Tokyo, Los Angeles, São Paulo, Rio, Cape Town, San Francisco, all over Europe, Poland, Germany, France, Italy, the UK and Russia (where he remains a regular fixture). His sound has morphed over the years from trance into electro house and now since 2007 into a balance of those influences with a progressive house backbone, returning to the melodic sound that he came from originally.

Tomcraft has released four albums to date, All I Got (2001), MUC (2003), HyperSexyConscious (2006) and For the Queen (2007), all on Kosmo Records.

His 2007 album, For the Queen, was a collaboration with Tobias David Lützenkirchen from their Great Stuff label, and while similar in style with previous Tomcraft releases, it is distinctive in a more narrative way, with less of the dance floor dimension of his previous works; he calls it a "feature album" and it is rich with collaborations and two covers.

Discography

Albums
 All I Got (2001) No. 97 Germany
 MUC (2003) No. 41 Germany
 HyperSexyConscious (2006)
 For the Queen (2007)

Compilation albums
 Tomcraft – The Mix (2003 remix album of other artists, with two exceptions, where other artists have remixed his tracks)

Singles
 "This Is No House" (1995)
 "Rollercoaster" (1995)
 "Viva" (1996)
 "Unicum" (1996)
 "Prosac" (1996)
 "The Circle" (1997) No. 52 Germany
 "Mind" (1997)
 "Gothic" (1998)
 "The Mission" (1998) No. 43 Germany
 "Powerplant" (1998)
 "Flashback" (1998)
 "The Lord" (1998)
 "Punk Da Funk" (1999)
 "Ezekiel 25.17" (1999)
 "Versus" (vs. Sunbeam) (2000) No. 50 Germany
 "Silence" (2000) No. 39 Germany
 "Prosac" (re-release) (2001) No. 50 Germany
 "All I Got" (2001)
 "Overdose" (2001) No. 38 Germany
 "Bang Bang" (2002)
 "Loneliness" (2002) No. 1 UK (2003 release), No. 10 Germany
 "Brainwashed (Call You)" (2003) No. 43 UK
 "Into the Light" (2003) No. 65 Germany
 "Great Stuff" (2003)
 "Another World" (by "Sonique On Tomcraft") (2004) No. 57 Germany
 "Dirty Sanchez" (2005)
 "Sureshot" (2005)
 "Quelle Heure Est Il" (2005)
 "Da Disco" (2006)
 "Sureshot 2006" (featuring Sido and Tai Jason) (2006) No. 34 Germany
 "Katowice" (2006)
 "Broadsword Calling Danny Boy" (featuring Jimmy Pop) (2006)
 "People Like Them" (featuring Xavier Naidoo) (2007)
 "Naked on Clouds" (2009)
 "Disco Erection Pt.1" (2009)
 "Disco Erection Pt.2" (2009)
 "Room 414 (Can't Get Away)" (2010)
 "A Place Called Soul" (2010)
 "Written High" (2011)
 "I Need Love" (2011)
 "Tell Mummy" (2011)
 "Taco" (2012)
 "Zounds of Arca" (2012)
 "Rock 'n' Roller" (2012)
 "Supersonic" (featuring Sister Bliss) (2012)
 "Like a Roller" (2013)
 "U Got 2 Know" (2013)
 "Happiness" (with Ilira an Moguai) (2020)

References

External links
 Official website
 Tomcraft on Facebook
 Tomcraft on thedjlist.com

1975 births
Living people
German DJs
German record producers
German house musicians
German trance musicians
Musicians from Munich
Progressive house musicians
Electronic dance music DJs